Pavlov Peak is a peak lying north of Mount Vesalius on Liege Island, in the Palmer Archipelago. It rises to 805 m and surmounts Beripara Cove to the east, Pleystor Glacier to the southwest and Zbelsurd Glacier to the northwest.

History 
The peak was shown on an Argentine government chart of 1954. It was named by the United Kingdom Antarctic Place-Names Committee (UK-APC) in 1960 for Ivan P. Pavlov (1849–1936), Russian experimental physiologist noted for his work on conditioned reflexes.

Further reading 
 Damien Gildea, Mountaineering in Antarctica: complete guide: Travel guide

Notes

External links 
 Pavlov Peak on USGS website
 Pavlov Peak on AADC website

References 
 

Mountains of the Palmer Archipelago
Liège Island